Ángelo Smit Preciado Quiñónez (born 18 February 1998) is an Ecuadorian professional footballer who plays as a right-back for Belgian Pro League club Genk and the Ecuador national team.

Club career
Born in Shushufindi, Sucumbíos, Preciado joined Independiente del Valle's youth setup in 2015, from América de Quito. In February 2018, during the semifinals of the 2018 U-20 Copa Libertadores, he went viral after using the corner flag to defend himself from a fight with the River Plate Montevideo players.

Promoted to the first team after playing a short period in the reserve team, Alianza Cotopaxi, Preciado made his senior – and Serie A – debut on 9 July 2018, starting in a 3–1 away loss against Aucas. He soon became a regular starter, and scored his first goals on 25 August by netting a brace in a 4–2 home defeat of El Nacional.

International career
On 4 May 2017, Preciado was called up to Ecuador under-20s for the year's FIFA U-20 World Cup, On 30 August of the following year, he was called up to the full side by manager Hernán Darío Gómez, for two friendlies against Jamaica and Guatemala.

Preciado made his full international debut on 12 October 2018, replacing Independiente teammate Stiven Plaza in a 4–3 loss against Qatar at the Jassim bin Hamad Stadium in Doha.

Career statistics

Club

International

Honours
Independiente del Valle
 Copa Sudamericana: 2019

Genk
 Belgian Cup: 2020–21

References

External links

Ángelo Preciado profile at Federación Ecuatoriana de Fútbol 

Living people
1998 births
People from Shushufindi Canton
Ecuadorian footballers
Association football defenders
Ecuadorian Serie A players
Belgian Pro League players
C.S.D. Independiente del Valle footballers
K.R.C. Genk players
Ecuador international footballers
Ecuador under-20 international footballers
Ecuadorian expatriate footballers
Expatriate footballers in Belgium
2021 Copa América players
2022 FIFA World Cup players